denotes a distinct kind of mathematics which was developed in Japan during the Edo period (1603–1867).  The term wasan, from wa ("Japanese") and san ("calculation"), was coined in the 1870s and employed to distinguish native Japanese mathematical theory from Western mathematics (洋算 yōsan).

In the history of mathematics, the development of wasan falls outside the Western realm. At the beginning of the Meiji period (1868–1912), Japan and its people opened themselves to the West. Japanese scholars adopted Western mathematical technique, and this led to a decline of interest in the ideas used in wasan.

History

The Japanese mathematical schema evolved during a period when Japan's people were isolated from European influences, but instead borrowed from ancient mathematical texts written in China, including those from the Yuan dynasty and earlier. The Japanese mathematicians Yoshida Shichibei Kōyū, Imamura Chishō, and Takahara Kisshu are among the earliest known Japanese mathematicians. They came to be known to their contemporaries as "the Three Arithmeticians".

Yoshida was the author of the oldest extant Japanese mathematical text, the 1627 work called Jinkōki.  The work dealt with the subject of soroban arithmetic, including square and cube root operations. Yoshida's book significantly inspired a new generation of mathematicians, and redefined the Japanese perception of educational enlightenment, which was defined in the Seventeen Article Constitution as "the product of earnest meditation".

Seki Takakazu founded enri (円理: circle principles), a mathematical system with the same purpose as calculus at a similar time to calculus's development in Europe. However Seki's investigations did not proceed from the same foundations as those used in Newton's studies in Europe.

Mathematicians like Takebe Katahiro played and important role in developing Enri (" circle principle"), a crude analog to the Western calculus. He used Richardson extrapolation in 1695, about 200 years earlier than Richardson. He also computed 41 digits of π, based on polygon approximation and Richardson extrapolation.

Select mathematicians 

The following list encompasses mathematicians whose work was derived from wasan.

 Yoshida Mitsuyoshi (1598–1672)
 Seki Takakazu (1642–1708)
 Takebe Kenkō (1664–1739)
 Matsunaga Ryohitsu (fl. 1718-1749)
 Kurushima Kinai (d. 1757)
 Arima Raido (1714–1783)
 Fujita Sadasuke (1734-1807)
 Ajima Naonobu (1739–1783)
 Aida Yasuaki (1747–1817)
 Sakabe Kōhan (1759–1824)
 Fujita Kagen (1765–1821)
 Hasegawa Ken (c. 1783-1838)
 Wada Nei (1787–1840)
 Shiraishi Chochu (1796–1862)
 Koide Shuke (1797–1865)
 Omura Isshu (1824–1871)

See also
 Japanese theorem for cyclic polygons
 Japanese theorem for cyclic quadrilaterals
 Sangaku, the custom of presenting mathematical problems, carved in wood tablets, to the public in Shinto shrines
 Soroban, a Japanese abacus
 :Category:Japanese mathematicians

Notes

References 
 Campbell, Douglas M. and John C. Iggins. (1984).   Mathematics: People, Problems, Results. Belmont, California: Warsworth International. ; ; ;   OCLC 300429874
 Endō Toshisada (1896). . Tōkyō: _.  OCLC 122770600
 Fukagawa, Hidetoshi, and Dan Pedoe. (1989).  Japanese temple geometry problems = Sangaku. Winnipeg: Charles Babbage. ;   OCLC 474564475
 __ and Dan Pedoe. (1991)  Tōkyō. ;   OCLC 47500620
 __ and Tony Rothman. (2008). Sacred Mathematics: Japanese Temple Geometry. Princeton: Princeton University Press. ;   OCLC 181142099
 Horiuchi, Annick. (1994).   Les Mathematiques Japonaises a L'Epoque d'Edo (1600–1868): Une Etude des Travaux de Seki Takakazu (?-1708) et de Takebe Katahiro (1664–1739). 	Paris: Librairie Philosophique J. Vrin. ;   OCLC 318334322
  __. (1998). "Les mathématiques peuvent-elles n'être que pur divertissement? Une analyse des tablettes votives de mathématiques à l'époque d'Edo." Extrême-Orient, Extrême-Occident, volume 20, pp. 135–156.
 Kobayashi, Tatsuhiko. (2002) "What kind of mathematics and terminology was transmitted into 18th-century Japan from China?", Historia Scientiarum, Vol.12, No.1.
 Kobayashi, Tatsuhiko. Trigonometry and Its Acceptance in the 18th-19th Centuries Japan.
 Ogawa, Tsukane. "A Review of the History of Japanese Mathematics". Revue d'histoire des mathématiques 7, fascicule 1 (2001), 137-155.
 Restivo, Sal P. (1992).  Mathematics in Society and History: Sociological Inquiries. Dordrecht: Kluwer Academic Publishers. ;   OCLC 25709270
 Selin, Helaine. (1997).   Encyclopaedia of the History of Science, Technology, and Medicine in Non-Western Cultures. Dordrecht: Kluwer/Springer. ;   OCLC 186451909
 David Eugene Smith and Yoshio Mikami. (1914).   A History of Japanese Mathematics. Chicago: Open Court Publishing.   OCLC 1515528;  see online, multi-formatted, full-text book at archive.org

External links
 Japan Academy,  Collection of native Japanese mathematics
 JapanMath,  Math program focused on Math Fact Fluency and Japanese originated logic games
Sangaku
Sansu Math,  translated Tokyo Shoseki Japanese math curriculum
 Kümmerle, Harald. Bibliography on traditional mathematics in Japan (wasan)

 
Mathematics